Merișor may refer to several places in Romania:

 Merișor, a village in Sita Buzăului Commune, Covasna County
 Merișor, a village in Bănița Commune, Hunedoara County
 Merișor, a village in Bucureșci Commune, Hunedoara County
 Merișor, a village in Tăuții-Măgherăuș Town, Maramureș County
 Merișor, a village in Glodeni Commune, Mureș County
 Merișoru de Munte (Merisor), a village in Cerbăl Commune, Hunedoara County

See also 
 Merești (disambiguation)
 Merișoru (disambiguation)
 Merișani (disambiguation)